David F. Hoover is a former American football player and coach.  He served as the head football coach at Wayne State University in Detroit, Michigan from 1972 to 1973 and at Emporia State University in Emporia, Kansas from 1974 until 1978, compiling a career record of 16–50–1. His record at Emporia State was 9–40.  Hoover played college football at Iowa State University from 1961 to 1963.

Head coaching record

References

Year of birth missing (living people)
Living people
Emporia State Hornets football coaches
Iowa State Cyclones football players
Wayne State Warriors football coaches